Josephus Clarence Newman Sr. (November 3, 1884 – April 6, 1945) was an American farmer and politician. Moving to Valley Park, Mississippi in 1917 to work as a foreman for the Illinois Central Railroad, he represented Issaquena County in the Mississippi House of Representatives. His fifth child, Buddie Newman was elected to the seat in 1951 and would go on to serve as Speaker of the House.

References

External links
 

Democratic Party members of the Mississippi House of Representatives
1884 births
1945 deaths
20th-century American politicians